Akai Ito may refer to:

Akai Ito (horse), a racehorse
Akai Ito (video game), a Japanese video game
Akai Ito (TV series), a 2008–2009 Japanese television drama
"Akai Ito" (song), a 2008 song by Yui Aragaki

See also
The Red Thread (disambiguation)
Red string (disambiguation)